Roland A. Chicoine (December 10, 1922 – May 19, 2016) was an American politician in the state of South Dakota. He was a member of the South Dakota House of Representatives and South Dakota State Senate. A farmer, he was an alumnus of South Dakota State University. He died at the age of 93 in 2016.

References

1922 births
2016 deaths
People from Elk Point, South Dakota
Farmers from South Dakota
Democratic Party members of the South Dakota House of Representatives
South Dakota State University alumni